The list of countries obtaining independence from Spain is a list of countries that broke away from Spain for independence, or occasionally incorporation into another country, as depicted in the map below. These processes came about at different periods and world regions starting in the 17th century (Portugal).

Independence waves
Since its beginnings in the 16th century, the Spanish empire conquered new areas starting out from its Castilian core kingdom. In 1597, the Spanish (Castilian) crown lost the Netherlands (Holland). In 1640, Portugal split away after Philip II had incorporated it to its domains in 1581. A second independence tide came about following the Independence of the Thirteen Colonies in North America and the Battle of Trafalgar that heralded the end of the Spanish Atlantic hegemony. Venezuela (1811), under the influence of the Basque Enlightenment, sparked the independence movements of Central and Southern America, spearheaded by Simon Bolivar.

During the Spanish Restoration in the late 19th century, the last major colonies Cuba, Puerto Rico and Philippines detached from the metropolis with the support of the United States. Since the 1950s, Spain lost the last continental lands in Africa, Spanish protectorate in Morocco, Ifni, Equatorial Guinea and Western Sahara.

States

See also
Mexican War of Independence
Spanish American wars of independence
Philippines revolution
Spanish–American War
Eighty Years' War
War of the Spanish Succession
List of national independence days
Spanish-American war

References

Spanish Empire
Overseas empires
Gained Independence From Spain
List of national independence days